Readergirlz is an online book community that is an advocate for literacy in teenage girls.  The site was founded on March 1, 2007 by Dia Calhoun, Janet Lee Carey, Lorie Ann Grover, and Justina Chen Headley.  The site is a partner of the Young Adult Library Services Association.  Readergirlz hosts authors monthly for an exchange with teens and administers special literacy projects, including the support of Teen Read Week, the third week of October, and Support Teen Literature Day in April.

Awards 
 $2,500 James Patterson PageTurner Organization Award
 $2,500 National Book Foundation 2009 Innovations in Reading Prize

Authors featured

References

External links 
 

American book websites
Internet properties established in 2007